The Tripartite Free Trade Area (TFTA) is a proposed African free trade agreement between the Common Market for Eastern and Southern Africa (COMESA), Southern African Development Community (SADC) and East African Community (EAC).

On June 10, 2015 the deal was signed in Egypt by the countries shown below (pending ratification by national parliaments).  

On June 15, 2015 at the 25th African Union Summit in Johannesburg, South Africa, negotiations were launched to create an African Continental Free Trade Area (CFTA) by 2017 with, it was hoped, all 54 African Union states as members of the free trade area.

References

External links
  (archived)

Economy of the African Union
Regional Economic Communities of the African Union
Trade blocs